The St. Sebastian's Church, Negombo, also known as St. Sebastian's Church, Wellaweediya, is a Roman Catholic church in Negombo, in Sri Lanka. It is architecturally based on the Reims Cathedral in France and is built in Gothic Revival style. Saint Sebastian is the patron saint of the city of Negombo.

Location 
The church is located on San Sebastian Street in Negombo.

History 
The church was designed by Father G. Gannon, parish priest of Sea Street. Although the foundation stone was laid by the Archbishop of Colombo, Pierre-Guillaume Marque, on 2 February 1936, construction was not completed until ten years later. It replaced a smaller church to accommodate the increasing number of parishioners in the majority catholic city. It is said to be modeled in Gothic Revival style on the lines of the Reims Cathedral in France. A shadow of this church is seen in the Negombo Lagoon.

This church is one of the many churches in Sri Lanka dedicated to St Sebastian, who is considered a martyr in the Catholic Church history. His veneration is particularly celebrated seeking relief from epidemics. A festival called the "Feast of St Sebastian" is held every year here during the month of January. A tali drama narrating the life of Saint Sebastian used to be enacted here before 1950. Now, "Raja Tunkattuwa", a Sinhalese language drama about the Three Kings is held here during Christmas.

Festival 
At the St. Sebastian Church an annual festival dedicated to St. Sebastian is held on 20 January. On this occasion a decorated flagstaff is affixed at the church premises. Processions are also organized and food is served free to poor people.

References

Bibliography 

1946 establishments in Ceylon
Roman Catholic churches in Sri Lanka
Tourist attractions in Western Province, Sri Lanka
Churches in Negombo
Roman Catholic churches completed in 1946
Gothic Revival church buildings in Sri Lanka
20th-century Roman Catholic church buildings in Sri Lanka
Saint Sebastian